Fahad may refer to places in Iran:
 Fahad, Khuzestan (فهد - Fahad)